Jean-Louis Descloux (born 3 November 1937) is a Swiss sprinter. He competed in the men's 200 metres at the 1964 Summer Olympics.

References

1937 births
Living people
Athletes (track and field) at the 1964 Summer Olympics
Swiss male sprinters
Olympic athletes of Switzerland
Place of birth missing (living people)